is a Japanese voice actress and narrator.

Notable voice roles
Class President – My Bride is a Mermaid
Sister Claire – Chrono Crusade
Elie's Mother – Groove Adventure Rave
Asuka Shiratori – Izumo: Takeki Tsurugi no Senki
Sugimoto – Jigoku Shōjo
Tetsuko Hongo – Magikano
Nori Sakurada – Rozen Maiden
Manaka Komaki – To Heart 2
Holly – Viewtiful Joe
Mito Mashiro – Tayutama
Kukuri Tachibana – 11eyes
Patchouli Knowledge, Luna Child – Koumajou Densetsu II: Stranger's Requiem, Koumajou Remilia: Scarlet Symphony
Miu Amaha – Mashiroiro Symphony
Sarah Jerand – Star Ocean: The Last Hope
Chiyo and Chinatsu - Swing Out Sisters

References

External links
RikiMARU Official Site (Japanese)

Noriko Rikimaru at Ryu's Seiyuu Info

1976 births
Living people
Japanese voice actresses